College Football on USA refers to the USA Network's cable television coverage of the college football regular season. USA's coverage ran from 1980 to 1986.

History
During USA's first three seasons (1980-1982), they broadcast several games (they in essence, cherry picked games from regional and national syndicators like Raycom, Mizlou, and Katz) a week. These broadcasts were shown on a tape delayed basis as much as two days later. For USA's final four seasons (1983-1986), they narrowed their coverage to only one game a week. Initially, the games were selected from virtually every conference. However, in the later years, USA would frequently (but not exclusively) air games involving Pittsburgh, Penn State, Notre Dame, Boston College and Maryland. More to the point, by 1984, USA primarily aired games from the Big Eight Conference.

Schedules

1984

Notable games
1981 Liberty Bowl - This was the first college bowl game to be exclusively broadcast on cable television.
"The Play" - The Play refers to a last-second kickoff return during a college football game between the University of California Golden Bears and the Stanford University Cardinal on Saturday, November 20, 1982. After Stanford had taken a 20-19 lead on a field goal with four seconds left in the game, the Golden Bears used five lateral passes on the ensuing kickoff return to score the winning touchdown and earn a 25-20 victory. Members of the Stanford Band had come onto the field midway through the return, believing that the game was over, which added to the ensuing confusion and folklore. There remains disagreement over the legality of two of the laterals, adding to the passion surrounding the traditional rivalry of the annual "Big Game."
The biggest highlight of University of Maryland quarterback Frank Reich's college career was the comeback he led against the University of Miami Hurricanes on November 10, 1984 at the Orange Bowl Stadium. Reich came off the bench to play for Stan Gelbaugh, who had previously replaced him as the starter after Reich separated his shoulder in the fourth week of the season against Wake Forest. Miami quarterback Bernie Kosar had led the 'Canes to a 31-0 lead at halftime. At the start of the third quarter, Reich led the Maryland Terrapins multiple scoring drives.  Three touchdowns in the third quarter and a fourth at the start of the final quarter turned what was a blowout into a close game.  With the score 34-28 Miami, Reich hit Greg Hill with a 68-yard touchdown pass which deflected off the hands of Miami safety Darrell Fullington to take the lead. Maryland scored once more to cap a 42-9 second half, and won the game 42-40, completing what was then the biggest comeback in NCAA history.
1985 Cherry Bowl - The end of NCAA control over television rights resulted in a major increase in televised games, and TV rights fees dropped sharply amid the resulting glut, something not anticipated by the Cherry Bowl organizers.
1985 Holiday Bowl
1985 Freedom Bowl

Simulcasts
1985 Independence Bowl (produced by Mizlou)
1985 Bluebonnet Bowl (produced by Lorimar Sports Network)
1986 Independence Bowl (produced by Mizlou)
1986 Peach Bowl (produced by Mizlou)

Notre Dame football

Since 2011, at least two games per-season are played in primetime often played at neutral venues for the purposes of recruiting and financial benefits for playing at those sites, a high-profile matchup involving a major opponent, or to schedule around conflicts with other NBC Sports or NBC News programming. On occasion, selected games may be shifted to an NBCUniversal-owned cable channel, such as NBCSN or USA Network.

Notre Dame's September 19, 2020, game against South Florida was shifted to USA Network due to conflicts with the 2020 U.S. Open on NBC, and co-produced with the school's in-house production arm Fighting Irish Media due to NBC's main production unit already being used for the tournament.

Notre Dame's double-overtime win against Clemson on November 7, 2020, was NBC's most-watched Notre Dame game since 2005, despite game coverage moving temporarily to USA Network (due to coverage of Joe Biden's acceptance speech after being declared consensus winner of the 2020 presidential election).

Commentators

Play-by-play
Eddie Doucette
Harry Kalas
Ray Lane
Barry Tompkins

Color commentary
John Beasley
Jim Brandstatter
Jeff Logan
Kyle Rote, Jr.
Joe Theismann

Sideline reporters
Johnny Holliday

References

USA
USA Network original programming
USA Network Sports
1980 American television series debuts
1980s American television series
1986 American television series endings